Fake Chemical State is the second solo album by Skunk Anansie lead vocalist Skin. Released on 20 March 2006, the album was produced by Gordon Raphael and Skin herself, except for the first single "Alone in My Room" which Skin produced with former Mansun lead vocalist Paul Draper. The track "Take Me On" features Italian music group Marlene Kuntz with whom Skin previously collaborated on the track "La canzone che scrivo per te" for their album Che cosa vedi.

The album was re-released in Italy on 17 November 2006. This release contained new artwork and a bonus DVD with the 4 singles' music videos and a 30-minute Electronic Press Kit.

Track listing
All songs were written by Skin and Paul Draper, except where noted.
"Alone in My Room" – 2:38
"She's On" – 3:16
"Movin'" (Skin) – 3:58
"Just Let the Sun" – 3:46
"Purple" (Gary Clark, Skin) – 3:42
"Don't Need a Reason" (John Blackburn, Ben Christophers, Elliot King, Wayne Riches, Skin) – 3:47
"Nothing But" (Skin) – 3:50
"Take Me On" – 4:06
"Fooling Yourself" (Len Arran, Skin) – 3:09
"Falling for You" (Arran, Skin) – 3:41

Bonus tracks
iTunes Store
"I Can Dream" [live] – 2:58

Japanese edition
"Cheating on Myself" – 3:47

Personnel
Skin - vocals, guitar (track 8), production 
Luca Bergia – drums (track 8)
John Blackburn – bass guitar (tracks 2 to 6 and 8 to 10)
Ben Christophers – guitar (tracks 3, 6, 9 and 10)
Paul Draper – production, guitar, bass (track 1)
Joshua Freese – drums (track 7)
Cristiano Godano – guitar (track 8)
Elliot King – guitar (tracks 2 to 7 and 9 to 10)
Mark Kulke - guitar
Linda Perry – bass, Mellotron (track 7)
Gordon Raphael – production (tracks 2 to 10), Hammond organ, synthesizer (track 4)
Mark Richardson – drums (tracks 9 and 10)
Wayne Riches – drums
Riccardo Tesio – guitar (track 8)
Technical
Alan Moulder - mixing
Derrick Santini - photography

Charts

References

Skin (musician) albums
2006 albums
V2 Records albums
Albums produced by Gordon Raphael